Traver House is a historic home located at Rhinebeck, Dutchess County, New York.  It was built about 1730 and enlarged about 1790.  It is a one to two story, stone and frame building built into a hillside.  It has a slate covered gable roof.  Also on the property are a contributing well / well house and stone retaining wall.

It was added to the National Register of Historic Places in 1987.

See also

National Register of Historic Places listings in Rhinebeck, New York

References

Houses on the National Register of Historic Places in New York (state)
Houses completed in 1730
Houses in Rhinebeck, New York
National Register of Historic Places in Dutchess County, New York